This is a list of the 176 English Heritage blue plaques in the London Borough of Camden.

References

External links

English Heritage – Blue plaques

Blue plaques in Camden
Lists of buildings and structures in London
Camden
London Borough of Camden